The 1965 Yugoslav First Basketball League season was the 21st season of the Yugoslav First Basketball League.

Classification

The winning roster 
The winning roster of Zadar:
  Miljenko Valčić
  Đuro Stipčević
  Milan Komazec
  
  Mile Marcelić
  Josip Đerđa
  Krešimir Ćosić
  Marko Ostarčević
  Vladimir Ćubrić
  Zanki
  Petar Anić
  Jure Košta
  Goran Brajković
  Petar Jelić
  Željko Troskot

Coach:  Enzo Sovitti

Scoring leaders
 Radivoj Korać (OKK Beograd) – ___ points (__ ppg)
 ???
 ???

Qualification in 1965-66 season European competitions 

FIBA European Champions Cup
 Zadar (champions)

References

Yugoslav First Basketball League seasons